The family Dipluridae, known as curtain-web spiders (or confusingly with other distantly related ones as funnel-web tarantulas) are a group of spiders in the infraorder Mygalomorphae, that have two pairs of booklungs, and chelicerae (fangs) that move up and down in a stabbing motion. A number of genera, including that of the Sydney funnel-web spider (Atrax), used to be classified in this family but have now been moved to Hexathelidae.

Description
Dipluridae lack a rastellum (stout conical spines) on their chelicerae. Their carapace is characterized by the head region not being higher than the thoracic region. Their posterior median spinnerets (silk-extruding organs) are much shorter than their posterior lateral spinnerets, which have three segments, and are elongated (almost as long as their opisthosoma). Most of the species are medium to small-sized spiders; some may measure about 15 mm. The cave species Masteria caeca is eyeless.

Biology
Members of this family often build rather messy funnel-webs. Some build silk-lined burrows instead of webs (Diplura, Trechona, some Linothele sp.). They generally build their retreats in crevices in earthen banks, the bark of trees, under logs or in leaf litter.

Distribution
As circumscribed , the family is mostly found in South America and the Caribbean, with some genera found in Australia and Oceania.

Genera

, the World Spider Catalog accepted the following genera:

Diplura C. L. Koch, 1850 — South America
Harmonicon F. O. Pickard-Cambridge, 1896 — Brazil
Linothele Karsch, 1879 — South America
Masteria L. Koch, 1873 — South America, Caribbean, Philippines, Central America, Oceania
Siremata Passanha & Brescovit, 2018 — Brazil
Striamea Raven, 1981 — Colombia
Trechona C. L. Koch, 1850 — Brazil
Troglodiplura Main, 1969 — Australia

Transferred to other families
The following genera are now placed in other families (elevated from subfamilies):

Allothele Tucker, 1920 → Euagridae
Andethele Coyle, 1995 → Ischnothelidae
Australothele Raven, 1984 → Euagridae
Caledothele Raven, 1991 → Euagridae
Carrai Raven, 1984 → Euagridae
Cethegus Thorell, 1881 → Euagridae
Chilehexops Coyle, 1986 → Euagridae
Euagrus Ausserer, 1875 → Euagridae
Indothele Coyle, 1995 → Ischnothelidae
Ischnothele Ausserer, 1875 → Ischnothelidae
Lathrothele Benoit, 1965 → Ischnothelidae
Leptothele Raven & Schwendinger, 1995 → Euagridae
Microhexura Crosby & Bishop, 1925 → Microhexuridae
Namirea Raven, 1984 → Euagridae
Phyxioschema Simon, 1889 → Euagridae
Stenygrocercus Simon, 1892 → Euagridae
Thelechoris Karsch, 1881 → Ischnothelidae
Vilchura Ríos-Tamayo & Goloboff, 2017 → Euagridae

Extinct species
Extinct genera and species that have been placed in this family include:
 †Clostes Menge, 1869 — , Eocene Baltic amber
 †Clostes priscus (Menge, 1869)
 †Cretadiplura Selden, 2005 — Early Cretaceous (Aptian) Crato Formation, Brazil
 †Cretadiplura ceara Selden, 2005
 †Dinodiplura Selden, 2005 — Early Cretaceous (Aptian) Crato Formation, Brazil
 †Dinodiplura ambulacra Selden, 2005
 †Seldischnoplura Raven, Jell & Knezour, 2015 — , Early Cretaceous (Aptian) Crato Formation, Brazil
 †Seldischnoplura seldeni Raven, Jell & Knezour, 2015
 †Edwa Raven, Jell & Knezour, 2015 —  Late Triassic (Norian) Blackstone Formation, Australia
 †Edwa maryae Raven, Jell & Knezour, 2015
 † Phyxioschemoides Wunderlich, 2015 —  Cretaceous Burmese amber
 † Phyxioschemoides collembola Wunderlich, 2015
 † Cethegoides Wunderlich, 2017 — Cretaceous Burmese amber
 † Cethegoides patricki Wunderlich, 2017

See also
 Spider families

References

 Murphy, Frances & Murphy, John (2000): An Introduction to the Spiders of South East Asia. Malaysian Nature Society, Kuala Lumpur.

Further reading
 Chickering, A. M. (1964): Two new species of the genus Accola (Araneae, Dipluridae). Psyche 71: 174-180. PDF
 Coyle, F. A. (1986): Chilehexops, a new funnelweb mygalomorph spider genus from Chile (Araneae, Dipluridae). Am. Mus. Novit. 2860: 1-10. PDF
 Goloboff, Pablo A. (1994): Linothele cavicola, a new Diplurinae spider (Araneae, Dipluridae) from the caves in Ecuador. J. Arachnol. 22: 70-72. PDF 
 Selden, P.A., da Costa Casado, F. & Vianna Mesquita, M. (2005): Mygalomorph spiders (Araneae: Dipluridae) from the Lower Cretaceous Crato Lagerstätte, Araripe Basin, North-east Brazil. Palaeontology 49(4): 817-826.

External links

Taxonomy, housing and captive breeding of Dipluridae sp. including key to all genera

 
Mygalomorphae families
Norian first appearances
Extant Late Triassic first appearances